Jackie Hill Perry (née Jackie Hill, born June 21, 1989) is an American poet, writer, and hip hop artist who initially garnered popularity for her performances of spoken word pieces such as "My Life as a Stud", "A Poem About Weed", and "Jig-a-Boo" at the Passion 4 Christ Movement (P4CM). She has written for various Christian ministry organizations, such as The Resurgence and John Piper's Desiring God, on the topic of Christianity and homosexuality. She signed to the Portland, Oregon-based Christian hip hop label Humble Beast in January 2014, and released her debut album on November 4, 2014, available both commercially and for free. Hill married fellow spoken word artist Preston Perry in March 2014; the couple currently has four children.

An encounter with sexual abuse as a child contributed to the confusion over her gender identity she faced while growing up, and Jackie Hill Perry at age seventeen discovered that she was a lesbian. She lived a life of sexual promiscuity and struggled with drug and pornography addiction, until her conversion to Christianity in 2008. Her self-proclaimed status as a former lesbian has sparked controversy, with many gay rights activists stating that sexual orientation cannot be changed and that Jackie Hill Perry's experience lend credence to the idea of conversion therapy. Jackie Hill Perry, however, maintains her belief that God can transform lives and that he empowers believers to resist temptation.

Biography

Early life (birth to 2008) 
Jackie Hill Perry was born Jackie Hill on June 21, 1989, in St. Louis. She was raised without a father in her home and experienced sexual abuse at the age of five. Hill attended church until she was ten. She said an encounter with sexual abuse, school bullying and a lack of attention from boys contributed to her struggle with gender confusion. Since the age of four, Hill thought she should have been born a boy, and at age six she started imitating male tendencies, such as standing up to use the toilet. At age 17, she started pursuing multiple serial relationships with other women. Hill's second girlfriend suggested that she become a stud, a woman who takes a masculine role in a lesbian relationship. Hill began to gain attention from girls when she assumed the stud role, explaining that "I was never the 'cute chick' but when I became a stud, it seemed like every girl wanted me. I would be in straight clubs and have girls throwing themselves at me. For a girl that's insecure and craves to feel loved, that was like a drug for me."

Hill Perry abused drugs and became addicted to pornography. In October 2008, she converted to Christianity.

Conversion and current activities (2008–present) 
As recounted in her poem "My Life as a Stud", Hill states that "...one day, the Lord spoke to me. He said, 'She will be the death of you.' In that moment, the scripture for the wages of sin equal death finally clicked." Hill left her girlfriend, returned to church, and started writing poetry. She performed her first spoken word piece at a P4CM poetry conference in 2010, and met Preston Perry, the man who would eventually become her husband. Over time, Hill gradually lost interest in women, and Preston proposed to her in August 2013 through the spoken word poem "The Covenant". The couple married in March 2014. Hill Perry attributes that change in her sexuality to God's transformation of her life.

Record label Humble Beast announced on January 7, 2014 that it had signed Hill Perry as an artist. She has appeared as a guest musician on several Christian hip hop recordings, including Because You Asked by Swoope and Instruments of Mercy by Beautiful Eulogy. Her debut album, The Art of Joy, was produced by Beautiful Eulogy and released on November 4, 2014  Hill Perry is also a staff member of the Legacy Movement ministry. In 2016, Hill Perry, JGivens and John Givez were featured on Lecrae's "Misconceptions 3" from the album Church Clothes 3. Hill Perry and her husband are part of "Poets in Autumn,” a worldwide tour of Christian spoken word artists including Ezekiel Azonwu, Chris Webb, Joseph Solomon and Janette...IKZ. They create collaborative and individual pieces that address topics in the Christian faith. In 2019, Hill Perry and her husband started a podcast called "Thirty Minutes with the Perrys." They offer insight on relationships, theology, politics, race, and parenting.

Stance on homosexuality
Jackie Hill Perry maintains that she is an ex-lesbian, and that her transition to heterosexuality is among the changes God worked in her life. On July 31, 2013, Christian hip hop radio show Wade-O Radio published an interview with Hill Perry where she spoke out against the Macklemore song "Same Love". Citing 1 Corinthians 6:9-11, she stated that "The word of God itself, apart from Jackie Hill, testifies that people can change. So if the word of God is the word of God, then we need to deal with that and believe that it's true. I think we've made God very little if we believe that he cannot change people. If he can make a moon, stars and a galaxy that we have yet to fully comprehend, how can he not simply change my desires?" This stance has been criticized by many, particularly gay rights activists. According to The Washington Times, Hill Perry's experience "runs counter to pronouncements by gay rights groups that exclaim sexuality as an inherent, immutable characteristic", and, even further, comes amid "wide-ranging reports about the psychological dangers of so-called 'reparative therapy,' which aims to change the orientation of homosexuals." Hill Perry estimates that about 40 percent of the messages she has received over social media have been negative. When Hill married Preston Perry in March 2014, one critic accused the couple of both being gay and marrying to "play God to a bunch of ignorant people."

However, Hill Perry, in her 2013 interview with Wade-O Radio, clarified that she does not believe that every Christian with a homosexual disposition will lose those desires. "If God chooses not to change my desires, he has promised to give me his Holy Spirit that will help me flee from them. There are people who were alcoholics for 20 years, went through rehab and they don't drink anymore, but sometimes they may be tested. If they see a bottle of whiskey, they're going to want that whiskey, but they have a choice."

Influences 
In an interview with The Gospel Coalition, Hill Perry cited Mali Music, Propaganda, and Ebony Moore as "a few people who inspire me to be great at my craft." Theologically, she names pastor John Piper as a major influence, and even based Art of Joy on Piper's book Desiring God, where Piper explains his concept of Christian hedonism. Hill Perry states that Aside from the doctrines of grace, it's one concept that has really renewed my mind when it comes to faith and sin. Now, when I look at certain sins, it's not, 'Oh, I'm just doing this because I want to.' No, what in this sin do you think will satisfy me that God can't? It makes my processing of my issues a lot deeper, and it's also expanded my view of God.

Writing
Jackie Hill Perry has written for various Christian ministry organizations, focusing on reconciling issues of homosexuality with Christianity. Among these are her articles "Love Letter to a Lesbian", written for Desiring God, a ministry of John Piper, and "A Christian Response to the Same-Sex Marriage Ruling", for The Resurgence, a ministry of the now-defunct Mars Hill Church.
Hill Perry also released her own book, Gay Girl Good God, which was published September 3, 2018. She is also author of a Bible study for women and teen girls "Jude: Contending for the Faith in Today's Culture.". Hill Perry released her second book, "Holier Than Thou: How God's Holiness Helps Us Trust Him" in 2021.

Discography

Studio albums 
 The Art of Joy (2014)
 Crescendo (2018)

References

Citations

Additional references
A brief TGC report on "Jig-a-Boo"
NPR report on formerly gay Christians
Rapzilla interview

See also
Spoken word

External links
 

1989 births
Living people
African-American activists
African-American Christians
American women rappers
African-American women rappers
African-American poets
American evangelicals
People self-identified as ex-gay
American Calvinist and Reformed Christians
Hip hop activists
American performers of Christian hip hop music
Poets from Missouri
Rappers from St. Louis
Calvinist and Reformed writers
American women poets
21st-century American women writers
21st-century American poets
21st-century American rappers
21st-century American women musicians
21st-century African-American women writers
21st-century African-American writers
20th-century African-American people
20th-century African-American women
21st-century women rappers